Plum Orchard  is an estate located in the middle of the western shore of Cumberland Island, Georgia, USA. The estate and surrounding area are listed on the National Register of Historic Places.

Designed by Peabody and Stearns for George Lauder Carnegie, a son of Thomas M. Carnegie and named after his uncle, Scottish industrialist George Lauder, it was formally dedicated on October 6, 1898. Peabody and Stearns also designed various additions to the mansion in the several following years, probably in 1906.

After George Lauder Carnegie died, his widow, Margaret Copley Thaw, remarried and moved to Lake Naivasha, Kenya (on the continent of Africa). Most of the original furnishings were sold, and furniture from Dungeness was brought in to furnish the house. The house was then occupied by the Johnston family, from Nancy Trovillo Carnegie Heaver/Johnston's branch of the family.

The estate is now part of Cumberland Island National Seashore.

The mansion includes a rare squash tennis court.

See also
Dungeness (Cumberland Island, Georgia)
National Register of Historic Places listings in Cumberland Island National Seashore
St. Marys Historic District (St. Marys, Georgia)
National Register of Historic Places listings in Camden County, Georgia

References

External links

, 10 photos

Houses in Camden County, Georgia
Historic districts on the National Register of Historic Places in Georgia (U.S. state)
Peabody and Stearns buildings
Greek Revival houses in Georgia (U.S. state)
Houses completed in 1898
National Register of Historic Places in Cumberland Island National Seashore
Historic American Buildings Survey in Georgia (U.S. state)
Carnegie family residences